Jacob M. Livingstone (January 1, 1880 – March 22, 1949) was a Major League Baseball pitcher who played in  with the New York Giants.

He was born in Saint Petersburg, Russia and died in Wassaic, New York.

External links

1880 births
1949 deaths
Major League Baseball pitchers
New York Giants (NL) players
Major League Baseball players from Russia
Bridgeport Orators players
Bristol Bell Makers players
New London Whalers players
Derby Angels players
Waterbury Rough Riders players
Russian baseball players